The folklore museum in Limenaria, Thasos was established in 1993 by To Kastro (The Castle), the Limenaria cultural association. It is housed in the former community office in the centre of the village. Limenaria is a village in the south of Thasos, 40 km from the main town, Limenas.

Exposition 

The purpose of the museum is to preserve and promote the local tradition. It therefore displays household artifacts and clothing (embroidery, woven fabrics, traditional costumes, stoves, a loom and its accoutrements, coffee-making equipment), tools of various trades (tailoring, barbering, woodcutting, bee-keeping, hunting, a shoemakers and a cobblers bench, tools for collecting and transporting resin, a raki still, tools for collecting olives), and tools from the time when the local mines opened. The museum also displays Mr Kyprianos Georgiadis‘ private collection of books and stationery.

References

Sources
 

Limenaria
Thasos
Museums established in 1993
1993 establishments in Greece